Glencairn is a small seaside village located on the Cape Peninsula, South Africa. It is situated about 4 km north of Simonstown, on the shore of False Bay. Access can be made from Fish Hoek or Simonstown via the M4, or from Noordhoek via the M6. Glencairn is made up of Glencairn Heights, Glen Ridge and Welcome Glen. There is a train stop at the south end of the suburb, with views across False Bay. The beach is actively utilised for leisure activities such as swimming, surfing, kayaking and snorkeling. The Glencairn tidal pool can be enjoyed on a high tide at the south end of the beach. The Glencairn Wetland conserves the lower Else River.

References

Suburbs of Cape Town